MSG is the second album by the hard rock band Michael Schenker Group, released in 1981. Producer Ron Nevison's high production values resulted in the recording of this album going over budget, a crippling debt that dogged the band for the rest of their short career.  MSG saw Schenker reunited with his former UFO bandmate Paul Raymond, and was the last album to feature Gary Barden until 1983's Built to Destroy.

Track listing

 Tracks 10 to 15 recorded live at the Manchester Apollo on 30 September 1980

Personnel
Band members
 Michael Schenker – lead guitar
 Gary Barden – vocals
 Paul Raymond – keyboards, rhythm guitar
 Cozy Powell – drums
 Chris Glen – bass

Additional musicians
Stephen Stills, Billy Nicholls – backing vocals

Production
Ron Nevison – producer, engineer, mixing
Rick Isbell, Renate, Mike Stavrou, David Wooley – assistant engineers
Gareth Edwards – live tracks engineer

Charts

References

1981 albums
Michael Schenker Group albums
Albums produced by Ron Nevison
Chrysalis Records albums
Albums recorded at AIR Studios